The Council of Europe Convention on the Counterfeiting of Medical Products and Similar Crimes involving Threats to Public Health (or MEDICRIME Convention) is an international criminal law convention of the Council of Europe addressing the falsification of medicines and medical devices.

Background 
The falsification of medicines and medical devices is an extremely profitable, low-risk form of crime, even in comparison with drug trafficking. These crimes endanger people’s health and lives, and thus may even violate the right to life enshrined in the European Convention on Human Rights. They also undermine public trust in health-care systems and health surveillance authorities.

History 
The convention was adopted by the Committee of Ministers of the Council of Europe in 2010, and opened for signature at a high-level conference organised in Moscow on 28 October 2011. Its official texts are in English and French, which are equally authentic. Other translations in non-official languages are also available, but they are for information purposes only.

To date, the MEDICRIME Convention is the only international legal instrument providing the means to criminalise the falsification of medical products.

Although drafted by a European institution, this convention is also open for signature and ratification by non-European countries.

Products covered by the convention 
Medicines for human and veterinary use, ingredients, parts and materials used in the production of medicines, medical devices, accessories and clinical trial medicines.

Key provisions 
The treaty contains 33 articles, organised in three fundamental pillars:

 criminalising the falsification of medicines and medical devices;
 protecting victims’ rights;
 encouraging national and international co-operation.

As a criminal law instrument, the convention does not deal with unintentional quality defects nor with the violation of intellectual property rights. It may use the term “counterfeit” meaning a “false representation as regards identity and/or source", but “falsification” is preferred as Medicrime is solely about protecting public health.

Criminalising the falsification of medicines and medical devices 
The convention criminalises certain acts because dangerous to public health. Only intentional acts are punishable offences.

 Article 5 stipulates that the intentional manufacturing of falsified medical products, active substances, excipients, parts, materials and accessories is a criminal offence.
 Article 6 provides that the intentional supplying (brokering, procuring, selling, donating or offering for free and promoting), keeping in stock, importing and exporting of falsified medical products, active substances, excipients, parts, materials and accessories are criminal offences.
 Article 7 specifies that intentionally producing false documents and tampering with existing ones are criminal offences.
 Article 8 establishes offences that are considered similar to falsification because they pose a serious threat to public health, such as intentionally manufacturing or placing medicinal products on the market without authorisation, including medical devices that fail to comply with conformity requirements.

Protecting victims’ rights 
The convention reinforces victims' rights by ensuring that they have access to all information relevant to their case, assisting them in their recovery and providing for their compensation, among others. Victims are not required to file charges or prove any harm suffered for an investigation to be opened – the risk of a threat to health is sufficient.

Encouraging national and international co-operation 
Co-operation at national and international level is an important aspect of the convention. Given the wide range of stakeholders confronted with the increasing prevalence of such crimes, from health authorities and law-enforcement agencies to customs services and the judiciary, synergies and co-operation among them should be promoted and facilitated. States parties to the convention are encouraged to set up a mechanism enabling the smooth exchange of information and co-operation within and across borders.

Parties

As of February 2021, there are 18 State Parties to the Convention on the Falsification of Medical Products and Similar Crimes involving Threats to Public Health: Albania, Armenia, Belgium, Belarus, Benin, Bosnia and Herzegovina, Burkina Faso, Croatia, France, Guinea, Hungary, Portugal, the Republic of Moldova, the Russian Federation, Spain, Switzerland, Turkey and Ukraine. Another 15 countries have signed but not ratified it. The Committee of Ministers of the Council of Europe invited Congo, Ecuador and Tunisia to accede to the MEDICRIME convention.

In July 2017, Burkina Faso became the 10th country to ratify the convention, triggering the establishment of the Committee of the Parties. This committee, named the MEDICRIME Committee, is the convention’s monitoring body and is tasked with facilitating the implementation and follow-up of the convention in the State parties as well as to facilitate the collection, analysis and exchange of information, experience and good practice between States to improve their capacity to prevent and combat the counterfeiting of medical products and similar crimes involving threats to public health. Its first meeting took place in December 2018 and it adopted its rules or procedure in its second meeting on 12-13 December 2020.

See also

Anti-Counterfeiting Trade Agreement
List of Council of Europe treaties

References

External links

Council of Europe Convention on the Counterfeiting of Medical Products and Similar Crimes involving Threats to Public Health (CETS No. 211), the MEDICRIME Convention
The MEDICRIME Convention – Latest news
Fondation Chirac: "La Convention MÉDICRIME entre en vigueur !"
GaBi Journal: "The MEDICRIME Convention: criminalising the falsification of medicines and similar crimes"
Fight the Fakes: The MEDICRIME Convention

Anti-counterfeiting treaties
Counterfeit consumer goods
Medical equipment
Medical crime
Council of Europe treaties
Treaties concluded in 2011
Treaties of Albania
Treaties of Armenia
Treaties of Belgium
Treaties of Benin
Treaties of Burkina Faso
Treaties of Croatia
Treaties of France
Treaties of Guinea
Treaties of Hungary
Treaties of Moldova
Treaties of Portugal
Treaties of Russia
Treaties of Spain
Treaties of Switzerland
Treaties of Turkey
Treaties of Ukraine
2011 in Russia
Treaties entered into force in 2016